du Maurier may refer to:
The du Maurier family:
George du Maurier (1834–1896), British author and cartoonist
Sir Gerald du Maurier (1873–1934), British actor, son of George
Angela du Maurier (1904–2002), British author and eldest daughter of Sir Gerald
Dame Daphne du Maurier (1907–1989), British author and middle daughter of Sir Gerald
Jeanne du Maurier (1911-1997), English artist and youngest daughter of Sir Gerald
Bedelia Du Maurier, original fictional character in NBC's Hannibal, played by Gillian Anderson
The du Mauriers, historical novel by Daphne du Maurier based on her family's history 
du Maurier (cigarette), a brand of Canadian cigarettes
du Maurier Classic, former name of the Canadian Women's Open golf tournament
du Maurier Jazz Festival, former name of the Toronto Jazz Festival
du Maurier Stadium, former name of Uniprix Stadium, a Montreal tennis stadium
du Maurier Open, former name of the Canada Masters tennis tournament